The 1950 SFR Yugoslavia Chess Championship was the 6th edition of SFR Yugoslav Chess Championship. Held in Ljubljana, SFR Yugoslavia, SR Slovenia. The tournament was won by Svetozar Gligorić. 
Vasja Pirc withdrew after eight rounds.

Table and results

References 

Yugoslav Chess Championships
1950 in chess
Chess